Kim Sung-ryung (born February 8, 1967) is a South Korean actress. After winning the Miss Korea beauty pageant in 1988 (she later represented her country at the Miss Universe 1989 pageant), Kim began her career as a reporter on KBS's showbiz news program Entertainment Weekly. In 1991, she made a memorable film acting debut in Kang Woo-suk's Who Saw the Dragon's Claws?, though she became more active in television in the next decade. She returned to the big screen in 2007, with notable supporting roles in Shadows in the Palace, and Rainbow Eyes, followed by The Client (2011), Mr. XXX-Kisser (2012), The Fatal Encounter (2014), and The Target (2014). As she entered her forties, Kim also became known for the television dramas You're Beautiful (2009), The Chaser (2012), Yawang (2013), The Heirs (2013), and Flower of Queen (2015).

Filmography

Film

Television series

Variety show

Hosting

Theater

Radio program

Awards and nominations

References

External links
 
 
 
  
 Kim Sung-ryung at Y.One Entertainment 

1967 births
Living people
Miss Korea winners
Miss Universe 1989 contestants
South Korean film actresses
South Korean television actresses
20th-century South Korean actresses
21st-century South Korean actresses